Dávid László (born 25 April 2002) is a Hungarian football forward who plays for Szentlőrinc on loan from Budapest Honvéd.

Career
On 30 July 2022, László joined Szentlőrinc on a season-long loan.

Career statistics

References

External links
 
 

2002 births
Living people
People from Székesfehérvár
Hungarian footballers
Hungary youth international footballers
Association football defenders
Budapest Honvéd FC players
BFC Siófok players
Budafoki LC footballers
Szentlőrinci SE footballers
Nemzeti Bajnokság I players
Nemzeti Bajnokság II players